Wallisia is a genus of flowering plants belonging to the family Bromeliaceae. It is also in the Tillandsioideae subfamily.

Its native range is central and southern Tropical America (within Belize, northern Brazil, Colombia, Costa Rica, Ecuador, French Guiana, Guatemala, Guyana, Honduras, Nicaragua, Panamá, Peru, Suriname and Venezuela) and Trinidad and Tobago (in the Caribbean).

Known species
As accepted by Plants of the World Online ::

The genus name of Wallisia is in honour of Gustav Wallis (1830–1878), a German plant collector. 
It was first described and published in Ann. Hort. Belge Étrangère Vol.20 on page 97 in 1870.

References

Tillandsioideae
Bromeliaceae genera